Ivan Oleksiyovych Ivanov (born 8 January 1989) is a Ukrainian professional triathlete. In 2013 he finished second at the ITU Aquathlon World Championships. He earned a bronze medal at the ITU World Cup event in Edmonton.

Ivanov competed at the 2016 Summer Olympics, finishing 49th. Initially he had not qualified.

References

Ukrainian male triathletes
Olympic triathletes of Ukraine
Triathletes at the 2016 Summer Olympics
Living people
1989 births
People from Horishni Plavni
European Games competitors for Ukraine
Triathletes at the 2015 European Games
Sportspeople from Poltava Oblast
21st-century Ukrainian people